Itaporanga d'Ajuda is a Brazilian municipality in the Northeastern state of Sergipe. It is home to the Tejupeba House and the Chapel of the Colégio Sugar Plantation, a plantation house and chapel cited as the first Jesuits settlement in Portuguese Brazil.

The municipality contains part of the Serra de Itabaiana National Park.

Toponym 

"Itaporanga" is a Tupi language term meaning "beautiful stone". It is formed by the word itá, meaning stone, and poranga, meaning beautiful. "D'Ajuda" is a reference to the patron of the municipality, Our Lady of Help (Nossa Senhora da Ajuda).

References most used

Populated coastal places in Sergipe
Municipalities in Sergipe